Gustorzyn  is a village in the administrative district of Gmina Brześć Kujawski, within Włocławek County, Kuyavian-Pomeranian Voivodeship, in north-central Poland. It is located in the historic region of Kuyavia.

Transport
The Polish A1 motorway runs nearby, east of the village.

References

Villages in Włocławek County